Arctenus is a monotypic genus of spiders in the family Ctenidae. It was first described by Polotow & Jocqué in 2014. , it contains only one species, Arctenus taitensis, from Kenya.

References

Endemic fauna of Kenya
Ctenidae
Monotypic Araneomorphae genera
Spiders of Africa